The Statute Law (Repeals) Act 1998 is an Act of the Parliament of the United Kingdom. It provided reform to the statute law in the areas of administration of justice, ecclesiastical law, education, finance, Hereford and Worcester, Inclosure Acts, Scottish Local Acts, Slave Trade Acts, as well as other miscellaneous items.

This Act implemented recommendations contained in the sixteenth report on statute law revision, by the Law Commission and the Scottish Law Commission.

Schedule 2
Paragraph 3 was repealed by section 109(3) of, and Schedule 10 to the Courts Act 2003.

Repeals

Administration of Justice

Group 1 – Sheriffs

Group 2 - General Repeals

Ecclesiastical Law

Group 1 – Ecclesiastical Leases

Group 2 – Tithes

Education

Group 1 – Public Schools

Group 2 – Universities

Finance

Group 1 – Colonial Stock

Group 2 – Land Commission

Group 3 – Development of Tourism

Group 4 – Loan Societies

Group 5 – General Repeals

Hereford and Worcester

Inclosure Acts

Scottish Local Acts

Slave Trade Acts 
 The Slavery Abolition Act 1833 was repealed in its entirety.  (The repeal did not make slavery legal since it only applied to the British Empire, slavery having been illegal in Britain long before.  Moreover, sections of the Slave Trade Act 1824, Slave Trade Act 1843 and Slave Trade Act 1873 continued in force and the Human Rights Act 1998 incorporates into British law Article 4 of the European Convention on Human Rights which prohibits holding people as slaves.

Statutes

Miscellaneous

Consequential and connected provisions

Slave Trade Act 1824 (c. 113)

Metropolitan Police Act 1839 (c. 47)

Public Schools Act 1868 (c. 118)

Slave Trade Act 1873 (c. 88)

Colonial Stock Acts 1877 (c. 59) and 1892 (c. 35)

Sea Fisheries Act 1883 (c. 22)

Fisheries Act 1891 (c. 37)

Finance Act 1931 (c. 28)

Science and Technology Act 1965 (c. 4)

Road Traffic Regulation Act 1984 (c. 27)

Clean Air Act 1993 (c. 11)

See also
Statute Law (Repeals) Act

References 
Halsbury's Statutes. Fourth Edition. 2008 Reissue. Volume 41. Page 1050.

External links
The Statute Law (Repeals) Act 1998, as amended from the National Archives.
The Statute Law (Repeals) Act 1998, as originally enacted from the National Archives.

United Kingdom Acts of Parliament 1998